It's Up to Emma is the sixth studio album by singer-songwriter Scout Niblett, released on May 21, 2013. It is Niblett's second release on Drag City records, after The Calcination of Scout Niblett in 2010. It's Up to Emma met with positive reception from indie rock critics upon release.

Writing and production
Niblett recorded It's Up to Emma at Type Foundry and Cloud City Sound in Portland, Oregon, as well as in New York City and in Niblett's residence. Unlike on her previous albums, Niblett chiefly produced the record as well as mixed it.

Niblett described the writing of the album as: "I think for me, [it] seems to be a reflection of a journey through all emotions. It feels like a document of an emotional evolution. Almost like the different stages of grief (anger, denial, acceptance, etc.), all about the same theme [...] The songs are really me dealing with being alone, and the path I took to learning to embrace and value being alone."

Reception

It's Up to Emma received positive critical acclaim from critics upon its release. Pitchfork called the album "the most listenable record Niblett has made since her debut; caustic in a totally different way than usual," and Allmusic noted that the songs "add up to a reckoning, an exorcism, and a letting go. Using ragged guitar riffs, basic drumming, some raw-sounding strings, and a deliberate lack of subtlety, Niblett goes straight at her subject." The Willamette Week echoed a similar sentiment, stating: "Don’t be fooled by the picture on the cover of Scout Niblett’s new album, a photo-booth shot of a couple in full make-out mode. The heart of It’s Up to Emma is not a romantic one. These nine brooding, deeply scarred songs—eight originals and one well-chosen cover—are performed and sung as a form of personal exorcism for Niblett."

Track listing

Personnel
Scout Niblett - vocals, guitar, bass, e-bow
Dan Wilson - drums, lead guitar
Jose Medels - drums, percussion
Emil Amos - bass, drums, e-bow, backing vocals

Technical personnel 
Scout Niblett - production, mixing
Danny Bensi - engineer, strings
Brandon Eggleston - engineer, mixing
Saunder Jurriaans - engineer, strings
Jason Powers - engineer, mixing
Carl Saff - mastering
Adam Selzer - mixing

References

2013 albums
Scout Niblett albums